Richard Allen Price (born August 14, 1933) is an American former politician in the state of Florida.

Price was born in Miami and attended the University of South Florida. He served in the Florida House of Representatives from 1973 to 1976, as a Republican, representing the 59th district.

References

Living people
1933 births
Republican Party members of the Florida House of Representatives